Robert Beatty was Dean of Ardfert from 1911 until 1917.

Beattie was educated at Trinity College, Dublin and  ordained in 1859. He began his ecclesiastical career with a curacy at Ballymachugh.  He was the incumbent at Tarbert, County Kerry from 1891 until 1911.

He died on 7 February 1921.

References

Alumni of Trinity College Dublin
Deans of Ardfert
1921 deaths